Super Adventure Team is an American comedy series shown on the cable television network MTV in 1998. The show is a superhero satire series using puppetry.

History
The show's co-creators, Rob Cohen and Dana Gould, met when writing for The Ben Stiller Show. The show debuted in July 1998 with a six-episode run.

The marionettes were voiced by comedians popular at the time — using aliases:
Talia Criswell was played by Karen Kilgariff — stage name Barbara St. Bill
Benton Criswell was played by Paul F. Tompkins — stage name Francis Mt. Pleasant
Chief Engineer Head was played by creator Dana Gould — stage name Benjamin Venom
Major Landon West was played by Daran Norris — stage name James Penrod
Colonel Buck Murdock was played by Wally Wingert — stage name Grant W. Wyllie

Keith Marder of the Los Angeles Daily News gave the show a positive review, saying that the use of puppetry gave the show an original look. He also thought that the show's comedy had the potential to make it a cult classic.

References

External links

1990s American satirical television series
1990s American superhero comedy television series
1998 American television series debuts
1998 American television series endings
American action television series
American adventure television series
American television shows featuring puppetry
MTV original programming